The Aeroalcool Quasar is a Brazilian light-sport aircraft that is produced by Aeroálcool and was introduced in 2007.

Design and development
The aircraft was designed by American Frank Porter with assistance from James Waterhouse of the Federal University of São Carlos in Brazil, to comply with the US light-sport aircraft rules. It features a cantilever low-wing, a two seats in side-by-side configuration enclosed cockpit under a forward hinged canopy, tricycle landing gear and a single engine in tractor configuration.

The aircraft is made from aluminum sheet and has a  span wing.

A total of 60 had been built by 2015.

Variants
Quasar Lite
Initial model, powered by the  Jabiru 2200 four-stroke powerplant.
Quasar 214SL
Import version for the US market, distributed by Quasar Aircraft Company, Inc. Accepted as a US light sport aircraft in 2007.
Quasar Fast
Model powered by the  Jabiru 3300 four-stroke powerplant.

Specifications (Quasar Lite)

References

External links

2000s Brazilian ultralight aircraft
Light-sport aircraft
Single-engined tractor aircraft